Lamar Morris (né Homa Lamar Morris; born 1938 Andalusia, Alabama) is an American country music singer and musician. Between 1966 and 1973, he was a solo artist on the MGM Records label, charting in the Top 40 of Hot Country Songs with "If You Love Me", which peaked at number 27.

Morris participated in both the 1968 and 1972 Presidential campaigns of George Wallace, for which he performed several songs including "Stand Up For America" and "Wallace in the Whitehouse".

Morris was also a member of The Bama Band, Hank Williams, Jr.'s backing band. He wrote the song "Eleven Roses" for Williams.

Charted singles

Family 
Morris, on June 24, 1960, married Lycrecia Ann Guy (born 1941), half-sister of Hank Williams, Jr. They since divorced.

References

People from Andalusia, Alabama
American country singer-songwriters
Living people
MGM Records artists
Country musicians from Alabama
Year of birth missing (living people)
Singer-songwriters from Alabama